Andrew Ramsay was the officiating governor of Bombay during the British Raj from 9 January 1788 to 6 September 1788.

References

Governors of Bombay
Year of birth missing
Year of death missing